On 28 July 2018, Air Vanuatu Flight 241, operated by ATR-72 registration YJ-AV71 suffered an in-flight engine fire while operating a domestic scheduled passenger flight from Whitegrass Airport, Tanna to Bauerfield International Airport, Port Vila, Vanuatu. On landing at Port Vila, a runway excursion occurred. The aircraft collided with two Britten-Norman Islanders, writing one off and severely damaging the other. Thirteen of the 43 people on board sustained minor injuries.

Aircraft
The aircraft involved in the accident were:
An ATR-72 of Air Vanuatu, registration YJ-AV71. msn 720. The aircraft first flew on 6 June 2005. At the time of the accident, it had accumulated 19,887 hours and 39 minutes flight time.
A Britten-Norman Islander of Unity Airlines, registration YJ-OO9, msn 65. The aircraft had first flown on 11 April 1969.
A Britten-Norman Islander of Air Taxi, registration YJ-AL2, msn 609. It had first flown in 1971.

Flight
Flight 241 was a domestic scheduled passenger flight from Whitegrass Airport, Tanna to Bauerfield International Airport, Port Vila Vanuatu. On 28 July 2018, the ATR-72 operating the flight suffered an engine fire in the right engine, while over the island of Erromango. Smoke and flames were witnessed by passengers, with smoke entering the aircraft's cabin. The engine was shut down and the aircraft continued to Port Vila. The pilots experienced difficulty controlling the aircraft, with uncommanded roll occurring. On landing, the aircraft departed the runway and collided with two Britten-Norman Islander aircraft belonging to Air Taxi and Unity Airlines. The aircraft belonging to Air Taxi was severely damaged, with its vertical stabilizer ripped off. It was damaged beyond repair. The other plane, of Unity Airlines was also damaged beyond repair. Although nobody was injured in the collision, thirteen passengers were treated for smoke inhalation. All four crew and 39 passengers on board evacuated the aircraft without injury. The pilots of the ATR-72 reported that they had no brakes or nose wheel steering, which they gave as the reason for the runway excursion and subsequent collision.

Investigation
The Civil Aviation Authority of Vanuatu asked Papua New Guinea's Accident Investigation Commission to investigate the accident. It released a preliminary report on 10 August. Canada's Transportation Safety Board is assisting the investigation.

See also
1968 Heathrow BKS Air Transport Airspeed Ambassador crash, in which an aircraft crash-landed and collided with two parked aircraft.

References

Aviation accidents and incidents in 2018
Aviation accidents and incidents in Vanuatu
2018 in Vanuatu
Accidents and incidents involving the ATR 72
Accidents and incidents involving the Britten-Norman Islander
July 2018 events in Oceania